Wesley Temple AME Zion Church is a historic church at 104 N. Prospect Street in Akron, Ohio, United States.

It was built in 1928 and added to the National Register in 1994. The Current Pastor of the Church is Rev. George William Whitfield.

References

External links
 Official website

Akron Wesley
Akron Wesley
Akron Wesley
Akron Wesley
Churches in Akron, Ohio
Akron Wesley
Akron Wesley
Neoclassical church buildings in the United States